Brazzeia longipedicellata is a species of plant in the family Lecythidaceae. It is found in the Democratic Republic of the Congo and Uganda.

References

Lecythidaceae
Endangered plants
Taxonomy articles created by Polbot